A Boy Called Sailboat is a 2018 American-Australian comedy-drama film written and directed by Cameron Nugent and starring Lew Temple, Elizabeth De Razzo, Noel Gugliemi, Jake Busey and J. K. Simmons.

At the ARIA Music Awards of 2020, its soundtrack was nominated for Best Original Soundtrack, Cast or Show Album.

Cast
Julian Atocani Sanchez as Sailboat
Jake Busey as Bing
J. K. Simmons as Ernest
Noel Gugliemi as José
Lew Temple as DJ
Bernard Curry as Referee / Hacienda Hill Actor / Instructional CD Voice
Elizabeth De Razzo as Meyo

Reception
The film has  rating on Rotten Tomatoes.

References

External links
 
 

2010s Spanish-language films
American comedy-drama films
Australian comedy-drama films
2010s English-language films
2010s American films